Radisnyi Sad is a rural settlement in Mykolaiv Raion, Mykolaiv Oblast (province) of Ukraine. It hosts the administration of Radsadivska rural hromada, one of the hromadas of Ukraine. Until May 2016, it was previously known as Radsad.

References

Notes

Rural settlements in Mykolaiv Oblast